Stenoptilia natalensis is a moth of the family Pterophoridae, and the genus Stenoptilia. It is known for being from South Africa.

References

Endemic moths of South Africa
natalensis
Moths of Africa
Moths described in 2010